Chlorine (17Cl) has 25 isotopes, ranging from 28Cl to 52Cl, and two isomers, 34mCl and 38mCl. There are two stable isotopes, 35Cl (75.77%) and 37Cl (24.23%), giving chlorine a standard atomic weight of 35.45. The longest-lived radioactive isotope is 36Cl, which has a half-life of 301,000 years. All other isotopes have half-lives under 1 hour, many less than one second. The shortest-lived are proton-unbound 29Cl and 30Cl, with half-lives less than 10 picoseconds and 30 nanoseconds, respectively; the half-life of 28Cl is unknown.

List of isotopes 

|-
| 28Cl
| style="text-align:right" | 17
| style="text-align:right" | 11
| 28.02954(64)#
|
| p
| 27S
| 1+#
|
|
|-
| 29Cl
| style="text-align:right" | 17
| style="text-align:right" | 12
| 29.01413(20)
| <10 ps
| p
| 28S
| (1/2+)
|
|
|-
| 30Cl
| style="text-align:right" | 17
| style="text-align:right" | 13
| 30.00477(21)#
| <30 ns
| p
| 29S
| 3+#
|
|
|-
| rowspan=2|31Cl
| rowspan=2 style="text-align:right" | 17
| rowspan=2 style="text-align:right" | 14
| rowspan=2|30.992448(4)
| rowspan=2|190(1) ms
| β+ (97.6%)
| 31S
| rowspan=2|3/2+
| rowspan=2|
| rowspan=2|
|-
| β+, p (2.4%)
| 30P
|-
| rowspan=3|32Cl
| rowspan=3 style="text-align:right" | 17
| rowspan=3 style="text-align:right" | 15
| rowspan=3|31.9856846(6)
| rowspan=3|298(1) ms
| β+ (99.92%)
| 32S
| rowspan=3|1+
| rowspan=3|
| rowspan=3|
|-
| β+, α (.054%)
|28Si
|-
| β+, p (.026%)
| 31P
|-
| 33Cl
| style="text-align:right" | 17
| style="text-align:right" | 16
| 32.9774520(4)
| 2.5038(22) s
| β+
| 33S
| 3/2+
|
|
|-
| 34Cl
| style="text-align:right" | 17
| style="text-align:right" | 17
| 33.97376249(5)
| 1.5266(4) s
| β+
| 34S
| 0+
|
|
|-
| rowspan=2 style="text-indent:1em" | 34mCl
| rowspan=2 colspan="3" style="text-indent:2em" | 146.360(27) keV
| rowspan=2|31.99(3) min
| β+ (55.4%)
| 34S
| rowspan=2|3+
| rowspan=2|
| rowspan=2|
|-
| IT (44.6%)
| 34Cl
|-
| 35Cl
| style="text-align:right" | 17
| style="text-align:right" | 18
| 34.96885269(4)
| colspan=3 align=center|Stable
| 3/2+
| 0.7576(10)
| 0.75644–0.75923
|-
| rowspan=2|36Cl
| rowspan=2 style="text-align:right" | 17
| rowspan=2 style="text-align:right" | 19
| rowspan=2|35.96830682(4)
| rowspan=2|3.013(15)×105 y
| β− (98.1%)
| 36Ar
| rowspan=2|2+
| rowspan=2|Trace
| rowspan=2|approx. 7×10−13
|-
| β+ (1.9%)
| 36S
|-
| 37Cl
| style="text-align:right" | 17
| style="text-align:right" | 20
| 36.96590258(6)
| colspan=3 align=center|Stable
| 3/2+
| 0.2424(10)
| 0.24077–0.24356
|-
| 38Cl
| style="text-align:right" | 17
| style="text-align:right" | 21
| 37.96801042(11)
| 37.24(5) min
| β−
| 38Ar
| 2−
|
|
|-
| style="text-indent:1em" | 38mCl
| colspan="3" style="text-indent:2em" | 671.365(8) keV
| 715(3) ms
| IT
| 38Cl
| 5−
|
|
|-
| 39Cl
| style="text-align:right" | 17
| style="text-align:right" | 22
| 38.9680082(19)
| 56.2(6) min
| β−
| 39Ar
| 3/2+
|
|
|-
| 40Cl
| style="text-align:right" | 17
| style="text-align:right" | 23
| 39.97042(3)
| 1.35(2) min
| β−
| 40Ar
| 2−
|
|
|-
| 41Cl
| style="text-align:right" | 17
| style="text-align:right" | 24
| 40.97068(7)
| 38.4(8) s
| β−
| 41Ar
| (1/2+,3/2+)
|
|
|-
| 42Cl
| style="text-align:right" | 17
| style="text-align:right" | 25
| 41.97334(6)
| 6.8(3) s
| β−
| 42Ar
|
|
|
|-
| rowspan=2|43Cl
| rowspan=2 style="text-align:right" | 17
| rowspan=2 style="text-align:right" | 26
| rowspan=2|42.97406(7)
| rowspan=2|3.13(9) s
| β− (>99.9%)
| 43Ar
| rowspan=2|(3/2+)
| rowspan=2|
| rowspan=2|
|-
| β−, n (<.1%)
| 42Ar
|-
| rowspan=2|44Cl
| rowspan=2 style="text-align:right" | 17
| rowspan=2 style="text-align:right" | 27
| rowspan=2|43.97812(15)
| rowspan=2|0.56(11) s
| β− (92%)
| 44Ar
| rowspan=2|(2-)
| rowspan=2|
| rowspan=2|
|-
| β−, n (8%)
| 43Ar
|-
| rowspan=2|45Cl
| rowspan=2 style="text-align:right" | 17
| rowspan=2 style="text-align:right" | 28
| rowspan=2|44.98039(15)
| rowspan=2|413(25) ms
| β− (76%)
| 45Ar
| rowspan=2|(3/2+)
| rowspan=2|
| rowspan=2|
|-
| β−, n (24%)
| 44Ar
|-
| rowspan=2|46Cl
| rowspan=2 style="text-align:right" | 17
| rowspan=2 style="text-align:right" | 29
| rowspan=2|45.98512(22)
| rowspan=2|232(2) ms
| β−, n (60%)
| 45Ar
| rowspan=2|2-#
| rowspan=2|
| rowspan=2|
|-
| β− (40%)
| 46Ar
|-
| rowspan=2|47Cl
| rowspan=2 style="text-align:right" | 17
| rowspan=2 style="text-align:right" | 30
| rowspan=2|46.98950(43)#
| rowspan=2|101(6) ms
| β− (97%)
| 47Ar
| rowspan=2|3/2+#
| rowspan=2|
| rowspan=2|
|-
| β−, n (3%)
| 46Ar
|-
| 48Cl
| style="text-align:right" | 17
| style="text-align:right" | 31
| 47.99541(54)#
| 100# ms [>200 ns]
| β−
| 48Ar
|
|
|
|-
| 49Cl
| style="text-align:right" | 17
| style="text-align:right" | 32
| 49.00101(64)#
| 50# ms [>200 ns]
| β−
| 49Ar
| 3/2+#
|
|
|-
| 50Cl
| style="text-align:right" | 17
| style="text-align:right" | 33
| 50.00831(64)#
| 20# ms
| β−
| 50Ar
|
|
|
|-
| 51Cl
| style="text-align:right" | 17
| style="text-align:right" | 34
| 51.01534(75)#
| 2# ms [>200 ns]
| β−
| 51Ar
| 3/2+#
|
|
|-
| 52Cl
| style="text-align:right" | 17
| style="text-align:right" | 35
| 
| 
| β−
| 52Ar
| 
|
|

Chlorine-36

Trace amounts of radioactive 36Cl exist in the environment, in a ratio of about 7×10−13 to 1 with stable isotopes. 36Cl is produced in the atmosphere by spallation of 36Ar by interactions with cosmic ray protons. In the subsurface environment, 36Cl is generated primarily as a result of neutron capture by 35Cl or muon capture by 40Ca. 36Cl decays to either 36S (1.9%) or to 36Ar (98.1%), with a combined half-life of 308,000 years. The half-life of this hydrophilic nonreactive isotope makes it suitable for geologic dating in the range of 60,000 to 1 million years. Additionally, large amounts of 36Cl were produced by neutron irradiation of seawater during atmospheric detonations of nuclear weapons between 1952 and 1958. The residence time of 36Cl in the atmosphere is about 1 week. Thus, as an event marker of 1950s water in soil and ground water, 36Cl is also useful for dating waters less than 50 years before the present. 36Cl has seen use in other areas of the geological sciences, forecasts, and elements. Those containing ). This produces a long lived radioactive product which has to be stored or disposed off. Isotope separation to produce pure  can vastly reduce  production, but a small amount might still be produced by (n,2n) reactions involving fast neutrons.

Chlorine-37

Stable chlorine-37 makes up about 24.23% of the naturally occurring chlorine on earth. Variation occurs as chloride mineral deposits have a slightly elevated chlorine-37 balance over the average found in sea water and halite deposits.

References

External links
Chlorine isotopes data from The Berkeley Laboratory Isotopes Project's

 
Chlorine
Chlorine